Anastasia Sergeyevna Sivayeva (born 10 November 1991) is a Russian actress of theater, cinema and television. Best known for the role of Darya Vasnetsova in the popular sitcom Daddy's Daughters.

Biography
Anastasia Sivayeva was born in Moscow, Russian SFSR, Soviet Union (now Russia).
Anastasia from five years was engaged in the studio of folk dance.
At the age of 7, she graduated from the children's modeling agency of Vyacheslav Zaitsev, and was enrolled in the fashion designer's theater of the same name. As a part of the collective, she repeatedly became a laureate of various competitions.

In 2000 she moved to the children's modeling agency Aleksey Bulanov, where she continued to study acting, modern dance, juggling, dancing on pointes, step, acrobatics, defile.

Nastya was noticed, and soon she was already filming in Russian version Sesame Street.

In 2003, the director Ivan Solovov confirmed her role as the daughter of the main character Margo in her film  Words and Music  (2004).

The following year, the shooting took place in the chanson clip of Mikhail Zadorin on the song Belorussian Station (directed by Yekaterina Grokhovskaya), and producer Boris Grachevsky invited Nastya to Yeralash, where she played the main roles in three stories.

In 2005, Anastasia Sivayeva participates in the television performance The Through Line  (directed by Peter Stein), based on the same name by Lyudmila Ulitskaya.

In 2007, she was invited to the first unadapted Russian sitcom Daddy's Daughters for the role of Darya Vasnetsova, who brought the actress wide popularity.

In 2010 Anastasia Sivayeva entered the acting faculty of the Institute of Contemporary Management, Cinema and Television (art directors   studio of Evgeny Zharikov and Natalya Gvozdikova).

In 2013, she starred in the Ilya Silaev's directorial debut   Ax.

Filmography

References

External links
  
 Фильмография Анастасии Сиваевой

1991 births
Living people
Actresses from Moscow
Russian child actresses
Russian film actresses
Russian stage actresses
Russian television actresses
21st-century Russian actresses